5-Methylmethiopropamine (5-MMPA, mephedrene) is a stimulant drug which is a ring-substituted derivative of methiopropamine. It is not a substituted cathinone derivative like mephedrone, as it lacks a ketone group at the β position of the aliphatic side chain, but instead more closely resembles substituted amphetamines. It has been sold as a designer drug, first being identified in Germany in June 2020.

See also 
 3-Chloromethamphetamine
 3-Methylamphetamine
 3-Methylmethcathinone
 5-Cl-bk-MPA

References 

Amines
Stimulants
Thiophenes
Designer drugs
Norepinephrine–dopamine reuptake inhibitors